"Stay" is a song by American rapper and singer Post Malone from his second studio album Beerbongs & Bentleys (2018). He wrote and produced it with Andrew Watt, with Louis Bell also receiving a writing credit. The song is an acoustic ballad with lyrics that center on a failing relationship.

Writing and production
Post Malone and Andrew Watt started to work on "Stay" after the singer expressed his wish to create folk music and use live instrumentation. They met up at the Henson Recording Studios in Los Angeles where they wrote the song together. While recording its instrumental, they played two guitars at the same time, with Watt using a 1946 Martin O-18 and Malone using a 1953 Gibson J-45.

The working title of the song was "George Forever", a reference to George Harrison. Before the release of Beerbongs & Bentleys, they decided to change the title to "Stay".

Music and lyrics
"Stay" is an acoustic ballad. It is composed in the key of C major, with a tempo of 88 beats per minute. Malone's vocals span from C4 to G5. Billboard said of the track that it has a "1970s AM radio vibe" and described it as "a hybrid of Britpop melody and emo bloodiness". Writing for The Line of Best Fit, Ross Horton described the song's genre as country folk.

The lyrics center on a falling relationship. Larry Bartleet of NME noted that Malone also sings about his bad habits and their effects, comparing this record to "Feeling Whitney", a bonus track from the artist's first studio album Stoney.

Release and promotion
On April 4, 2018, a preview of "Stay" was posted on Yahoo! Entertainment's website. Later that day, Malone performed it on stage for the first time during a live show played in Nashville, Tennessee as part of Bud Light's Dive Bar tour. The performance was simultaneously live streamed online.

On February 10, 2019, Malone performed a three-songs medley during the 61st Annual Grammy Awards ceremony. He started by performing "Stay" on the main stage while playing an acoustic guitar. It was followed by a solo rendition of "Rockstar" performed by the singer in a smokey tunnel. He carried on by joining the Red Hot Chili Peppers on the main stage for a joint performance of the band's 2016 single "Dark Necessities".

Critical reception
Writing for Vanity Fair, Erin Vanderhoof praised the song's lyrics, calling "Stay" a "testament to Malone's skills as a songwriter". Beth Smith of Melodic, wrote that it is "lyrically one of the strongest tracks of the album" and thought that it helped showcasing the singer's vocal ability.

Commercial performance
In the US, "Stay" debuted at 17 on the Billboard Hot 100 songs chart dated May 12, 2018. It was one of the singer's nine entries on the chart's top 20 that week, making him the singer with the most simultaneous top 20 songs, surpassing the record formerly held by The Beatles and J. Cole. On March 13, 2019, "Stay" was certified platinum by the Recording Industry Association of America (RIAA) for track-equivalent sales of one million units.

Cover version
A cover of "Stay" was recorded by Australian boys band 5 Seconds of Summer and released in August 2018 for Spotify Singles alongside a toned-down version of their own single "Lie to Me". Most of the vocals were provided by Luke Hemmings and Michael Clifford. The band's drummer Ashton Irwin explained on Twitter that they chose to cover this song because they find it "beautifully written", comparing it to the work of The Beatles.

Charts

Certifications

References

2018 songs
2010s ballads
American country music songs
American folk songs
Country ballads
Folk ballads
Post Malone songs
Songs written by Andrew Watt (record producer)
Songs written by Louis Bell
Songs written by Post Malone
Song recordings produced by Post Malone